Stizocephalus brevirostris is a species of dirt-colored seed bug in the family Rhyparochromidae, found in New Zealand.

References

External links

 

Rhyparochromidae